Ofe Owerri is an Igbo delicacy  in the South-Eastern part of Nigeria. The soup is made with snails, beef,assorted meat and fishes.

Origin 
As  the name implies the soup is popular amongst the people living in the capital of imo state, Owerri.

Overview 
The soup is one of the most  expensive Igbo  soup  and that's why Ofe Owerri got the nickname 'Jewel of South East'.

Varieties of vegetables such as okazi and uziza leaf are used in preparing the Igbo delicacy. Ugu can serve as an alternative to uziza when it is not readily available. Other ingredients include different type of fish and meats and crayfish.   Ofe Owerri is cooked with palm oil and achi is used to thicken the soup.

Other foods 
Ofe Owerri can be eaten with semolina, fufu, pounded yam and Eba

See also 
Nigeria cuisine

Owerri

onGACIOUS

References

Igbo cuisine
Nigerian soups
Vegetable dishes
Meat dishes